Bernarda Alba is a one-act musical with music, lyrics and book by Michael John LaChiusa, based on Federico García Lorca's 1936 play The House of Bernarda Alba.  Bernarda Alba tells the story of a controlling, newly widowed mother who is challenged by her five rebellious daughters. The musical opened Off Broadway at Lincoln Center's Mitzi E. Newhouse Theater in 2006, to mixed reviews.

Productions
With direction and choreography by Graciela Daniele, the all-female cast starred Phylicia Rashad and Daphne Rubin-Vega. The production had a limited run from March 6 to April 9, 2006. The production received Lucille Lortel Awards and Outer Critics Circle Awards Best Musical and choreography (Daniele) nominations. The lighting designer (Stephen Strawbridge) received nominations from Lortel, Henry Hewes Design Awards, and Outer Critics Circle. Daniele also received a Callaway Award nomination for choreography. A cast recording was released by Ghostlight Records in July 2006.

The UK premiere opened at the Union Theatre in London on August 23, 2011, produced by Triptic. The production was directed by Katherine Hare with musical direction by Leigh Thompson and choreography by Racky Plews. This production received a positive response from UK based critics. "SIMPLY ELECTRIC... a rather unique but unmissable piece of theatre." ThePublicReviews.com

Casts
Original 2006 New York cast
 Phylicia Rashad – Bernarda Alba
 Saundra Santiago – Angustias
 Judith Blazer – Magdalena
 Sally Murphy – Amelia
 Daphne Rubin-Vega – Martirio
 Nikki M. James – Adela
 Yolande Bavan – Maria Josepha
 Candy Buckley – Poncia
 Nancy Ticotin – Servant/Prudencia
 Laura Shoop – Young Maid
 
Original 2011 London cast
 Beverley Klein – Bernarda Alba
 Sophie Jugé – Angustias
 Soophia Foroughi – Magdalena
 Emily-Jane Morris – Amelia
 Rebecca Trehearn – Martirio
 Amelia Adams-Pearce – Adela 
 Buster Skeggs – Maria Josepha
 Ellen O’grady – Poncia
 Suanne Braun – Servant/Prudencia
 Maria Coyne – Young Maid

Musical numbers 
 Prologue – Poncia, Women
 The Funeral – Bernarda, Women
 On the Day That I Marry – Young Maid, Bernarda, Poncia, Servant
 Bernarda's Prayer – Bernarda
 Love, Let Me Sing You – Amelia, Martirio, Magdalena, Adela, Servant
 Let Me Go To the Sea – Maria Josepha, Women
 Magdalena – Magdalena
 Angustias – Angustias, Women
 Amelia – Amelia, Young Maid, Servant
 Martirio – Martirio
 Adela – Adela, Daughters
 I Will Dream of What I Saw – Women
 Poncia – Poncia
 Limbrada's Daughter – Bernarda, Women
 One Moorish Girl – Young Maid, Servant, Poncia
 The Smallest Stream – Bernarda
 The Mare and the Stallion – Daughters
 Lullaby – Maria Josepha
 Open the Door – Adela, Women
 Finale – Bernarda

Analysis
The characters sing the story as in an opera. One motif, of "barrenness and unappeasable longing" is seen in the production's design. For example, armless wooden chairs are lined against the back white stone wall, with its large door shut against the world. "When Bernarda draws the bolt, a sense of airlessness immediately descends over the daughters, illogical as this seems."
  
"LaChiusa and Daniele are determined to illustrate passion as vividly as possible in what is being called a musical but could just as easily be described as a dance piece with singing, an oratorio, or performance art. It's a beautifully seamless fusion of all these influences."

Response
Ben Brantley, reviewing for The New York Times, wrote, "This latest offering from the prolific Mr. LaChiusa, often feels wan and weary...The music, though superbly orchestrated (by Michael Starobin) and played, goes places that singers used to hard-sell Broadway pizazz cannot follow. The punctuating yelps; the wavering sustained notes in minor keys; the labyrinthine interior musical paths; the eruptions into antimelodic harshness — these are all more the stuff of mid-20th-century chamber operas than conventional show tunes...The touchingly game performers, who include musical pros like Daphne Rubin-Vega (a haunting presence as the ugly daughter) and Yolande Bavan (as Bernarda's senile mother), inevitably stumble over such challenges."

The Curtain Up reviewer noted, "Graciela Daniele's direction and choreography bring out the vivid flamenco rhythm that flavors the score. The daughters' solo arias beautifully express their individual personalities. Despite it requiring a stretch to accept the pretty Daphne Rubin-Vega as the family ugly duckling, her voice and poignant acting stand out...audiences are likely to be split between those who will love its art-y gloominess and those (this critic among them) for whom it's less exhilarating than such LaChiusa works as See What I Want to See..."

References

External links
Internet Off-Broadway listing
Bernarda Alba plot and production at guidetomusicaltheatre.com
Bernarda Alba plot and production at rnh.com(Rodgers and Hammerstein)

2006 musicals
Off-Broadway musicals
Musicals based on plays